Christopher Hugh Naunton is a British Egyptologist, a writer and a broadcaster, and an expert on the life of Flinders Petrie.

He studied Egyptology at the universities of Birmingham and Swansea, and obtained his PhD. He has been director of the Egypt Exploration Society. In 2013, he presented Tutankhamun: The mystery of the Burnt Mummy on Channel 4 in the UK.

Chris Naunton has been involved in a program for teaching Egyptology and the history of ancient Egypt named Playing in the Past, a T.tv series, based on the reconstructions of the video game "Assassin's Creed Origins", which he considers as "the best visualization of ancient Egypt".

Books

References

British Egyptologists
Year of birth missing (living people)
Living people